Robert Clarence Palm (October 27, 1907 – April 21, 1969), nicknamed "Spoony", was an American Negro league catcher who played for several teams between 1927 and 1946.

A native of Georgetown, Texas, Palm played a key role on the St. Louis Stars' 1928 Negro National League championship team. He died in New York, New York in 1969 at age 61.

References

External links
 and Baseball-Reference Black Baseball stats and Seamheads

1907 births
1969 deaths
Birmingham Black Barons players
Brooklyn Eagles players
Chicago American Giants players
Cleveland Giants players
Detroit Stars players
Homestead Grays players
New York Black Yankees players
Philadelphia Stars players
Pittsburgh Crawfords players
St. Louis Stars (baseball) players
20th-century African-American sportspeople
Baseball catchers